Hemidactylus karenorum, commonly known as the Burmese leaf gecko, the Burmese leaf-toed gecko, or the Burmese spotted gecko, is a species of gecko, a lizard in the family Gekkonidae. The species is endemic to Southeast Asia.

Etymology
The specific name, karenorum, is in honor of the Karen people, a hill tribe in Myanmar.

Description
H. karenorum has the following characteristics: Snout longer than the distance between the eye and the ear-opening, one and one third or one and two fifths the diameter of the orbit; forehead slightly concave; ear-opening small, roundish. Head granular, the granules enlarged on the snout. Rostral 4-sided, not quite twice so broad as high, with median cleft above; nostril bordered by the rostral, the first labial and three nasals. 11 or 12 upper and seven to 9 lower labials; mental large, triangular; two pair of chin-shields, median pair in contact. Body covered with minute granules and numerous small convex round tubercles; a slight lateral fold and another bordering the thighs posteriorly. Ventral scales cycloid, imbricate. Male with six pre-anal pores in an angular series. The female has six enlarged scales in the pre-anal region. Tail depressed, flat below, with sharp denticulated lateral edge, covered above with equal small scales, below with a median series of large transversely dilated plates. Limbs moderate; digits free, dilated, inner well developed; infradigital lamellae curved, five under the thumb, nine under the fourth finger, 5 or 6 under the first toe, 10 or 12 under the fourth toe. Light grey-brown above, variegated with darker brown. Lower parts whitish. Length of head and body 50 mm.; tail 56 mm.

Geographic range
H. karenorum is found in Myanmar (formerly known as Burma).

The type locality given by Theobald is "Karen-choung, prope Tonghu" (= Karen-choung, near Taungoo, Myanmar).

References

Further reading
Boulenger GA (1885). Catalogue of the Lizards in the British Museum (Natural History). Second Edition. Volume I. Geckonidæ, Eublepharidæ, Uroplatidæ, Pygopodidæ, Agamidæ. London: Trustees of the British Museum (Natural History). (Taylor and Francis, printers). xii + 436 pp. + Plates I-XXXII. (Hemidactylus karenorum, new combination, p. 140).
Boulenger GA (1890). The Fauna of British India, Including Ceylon and Burma. Reptilia and Batrachia. London: Secretary of State for India in Council. (Taylor and Francis, printers). xviii + 541 pp. (Hemidactylus karenorum, pp. 93–94).
Smith MA (1935). The Fauna of British India, Including Ceylon and Burma. Reptilia and Amphibia. Vol. II.—Sauria. London: Secretary of State for India in Council. (Taylor and Francis, printers). xiii + 440 pp. + Plate I + 2 maps. (Hemidactylus karenorum, p. 102).
Theobald W (1868). "Catalogue of the Reptiles of British Birma [sic], embracing the Provinces of Pegu, Martaban, and Tenasserim; with descriptions of new or little-known species". J. Linnean Soc. London, Zool. 10: 4-67. (Doryura karenorum, new species, pp. 30–31). (in Latin and English).

External links

Hemidactylus
Taxa named by William Theobald
Reptiles described in 1868